Edmund Joseph Sablan Villagomez is a politician from the Northern Mariana Islands who serves as the Speaker of the Northern Mariana Islands House of Representatives.

Political career
Villagomez was first elected from District 3 in 2009 as a member of the Covenant Party. Following the dissolution of the Covenant Party in 2013, Villagomez ran as an independent in the 2014 election.

In the 22nd Commonwealth Legislature, a coalition of legislators led by a resurgent Democratic Party backed Villagomez for Speaker. On the fourth ballot, Representative Ralph Naraja Yumul switched his support to Villagomez. Villagomez was reelected as Speaker in the 23rd Commonwealth Legislature.

References

21st-century American politicians
Covenant Party (Northern Mariana Islands) politicians
Living people
Northern Mariana Islands politicians
People from Saipan
Year of birth missing (living people)